Traveller Alien Module 6: Solomani is a supplement published by Game Designers' Workshop (GDW) in 1986 for the science fiction role-playing game Traveller.

Description
This book details  the Solomani Confederation and includes:
 its history
 its political system
 how to create Solomani characters
 new rules for adventures set in the Solomani Rim
 updated rules for mercenaries, Army and Navy.
 Universal Planetary Profiles for hundreds of worls within the Solomani sector. 
 A large map of the sector
 a short four-page adventure, "The Lost Colony"

Publication history
GDW first published Traveller in 1977, and followed this with dozens of supplements and adventures, including a series of supplements about aliens. Traveller Alien Module 6: Solomani is the sixth book in this series, a 48-page book by John Harshman and Marc W. Miller, with additional material by J. Andrew Keith and Rob Toy, interior art by William H. Keith Jr. and Steve Venters, and cover art by Dave Dietrick.

Reception
Jim Bambra reviewed Traveller Alien Module 6: Solomani for White Dwarf #84, and stated that "Like previous alien modules, Solomani vividly recreates an alien society; it's a must for any campaign set in or near the Solomani Confederation."

Other reviews
 The Imperium Staple, Issue #2 (Apr 1986, p.12)

See also

References

Role-playing game supplements introduced in 1986
Traveller (role-playing game) supplements